Margaret M. Faul is an Irish / American chemist and executive who has won multiple awards for innovations in process chemistry.

Background 
Faul received her undergraduate degrees from University College, Dublin before embarking on doctoral studies with Professor David A. Evans at Harvard. Her studies focused mostly on metal-catalyzed nitrene transfer reactions to produce aziridines, strained nitrogen precursors valued as pharmaceutical intermediates. Faul introduced multiple new wrinkles into this chemistry, including using chiral copper(I) catalysts to produce enantiomerically-enriched aziridines, and using a variety of different nitrene sources for the transfer.

Research 
Faul joined the process chemistry group at Eli Lilly in 1993, and joined Amgen's process group in 2003, rising eventually to its Executive Director. According to a biosketch at Organic Syntheses, Faul has expertise in Good Manufacturing Process scale-up of both chemical and biological therapeutics, and coordinates groups of external partners through licensing, regulatory, and program development issues. She attributes much of Amgen's success in this area to early adoption of new technologies, such as supercritical carbon dioxide purification and ultra-high performance liquid chromatography (uPLC).

Volunteer work 
Faul is an Editorial Board member at Thieme journal Science of Synthesis. She has served as the Chair of the Enabling Technologies Consortium.

Awards and honors 

 2019 - Fellow of the American Chemical Society (ACS)
2019 - Inaugural Margaret M. Faul Women in Chemistry Award, Thieme Publishers
 2018 - Earl B. Barnes award for Chemical Research Management, ACS
 2017 - Accepted the Presidential Green Chemistry Challenge award on behalf of Amgen Process
 1986 - Hugh Ryan Memorial Medal, UCD

References 

Living people
American women chemists
Irish women chemists
Year of birth missing (living people)
Alumni of University College Dublin
Harvard Graduate School of Arts and Sciences alumni
21st-century American women